Kalateh-ye Khan (also Romanized as Kalāteh-ye Khān; also known as Kalāt-ye Khān and Kalāt-e Jān Maḩmūd) is a village in Neh Rural District, in the Central District of Nehbandan County, South Khorasan Province, Iran. At the 2006 census, its population was 67, in 13 families.

References 

Populated places in Nehbandan County